The Marcel Proust Prize is a former literary award of France.  Created by the municipal council of Cabourg, in Normandy, in 1972, it was awarded until 1994; the recipient was a work which evoked that of Marcel Proust.  Writers were awarded 5,000 francs for their work.

List of winners 
 1972: Michel Robida for Le Dragon de Chartres (Julliard)
 1973: Georges Cattaui for Proust et ses métamorphoses (Nizet)
 1974: Julien Green for Jeunesse (Plon)
 1975: Emmanuel Berl for A venir et Regain au pays d'Auge (Le Livre de Poche)
 1976: Marcel Schneider for Sur une étoile (Grasset)
 1977: Jacques de Lacretelle for Les Vivants et leur ombre (Grasset)
 1978: Roger Caillois for Le Fleuve Alphée (Gallimard)
 1979: Henri Bonnet for Le Progrès spirituel dans la Recherche (Nizet)
 1980: Jacques de Bourbon Busset for Les Choses simples (Gallimard)
 1981: Angelo Rinaldi for La Dernière fête de l'Empire (Gallimard)
 1982: Alain Bosquet for L'Enfant que tu étais (Grasset)
 1983: Jean Delay for La Fauconnier, Avant-Mémoire (Gallimard)
 1984: Robert de Saint-Jean for Passé pas mort (Grasset)
 1985: Diane de Margerie for Le Ressouvenir (Flammarion)
 1986: François-Olivier Rousseau for Sébastien Doré (Mercure de France)
 1987-1988 : Claude Mauriac for Le Temps immobile (Grasset)
 1993: René de Obaldia for Exobiographie
 1994: Jean Chalon for Liane de Pougy, courtisane princesse et sainte (Flammarion)

References
Roger Peyrefitte (L'Illustre Écrivain, Albin Michel, 1982, pp. 130–131).

French literary awards
Awards established in 1972
Awards disestablished in 1994
Marcel Proust
1972 establishments in France
1994 disestablishments in France